Stephen Seymour is a set decorator.

Stephen, Steven or Steve Seymour may also refer to:

Steven Seymour, see 2010 in poetry
Steve Seymour, athlete
Steve Seymour (basketball)